The Georgia men's national basketball team represents the country of Georgia in international basketball matches, and is controlled by the Georgian Basketball Federation. Georgia became a member of FIBA in 1992, after they gained independence from the Soviet Union. The national team played their first official match against Poland in 1995.

Georgia's accomplishments on the international stage have been clinching qualification to the European Basketball Championship five times. Their best result came at their debut trip to the tournament in 2011. In 2023, Georgia achieved their first qualification to the top global competition at the FIBA World Cup.

History

Soviet era
Until 1991, Georgia was a part of the Soviet Union, with players born in Georgia playing for the Soviet Union national team. Notable players born in Georgia who played for the Soviet Union and won medals at the Olympic Games, FIBA World Cup and EuroBasket include: Nodar Dzhordzhikiya, Otar Korkia, Guram Minashvili, Vladimer Ugrekhelidze, Levan Moseshvili, Zurab Sakandelidze, Mikheil Korkia and Nikolay Deryugin.

Independent Georgia
After gaining independence from the Soviet Union, on several occasions the Georgian national team unsuccessfully tried to qualify for the EuroBasket, Europe's biggest basketball competition and major tournament. Although the national team did play on the EuroBasket Division B level three times and gained promotion in 2009 after defeating Belarus in play-offs. However, after the expansion of the EuroBasket in 2011 from 16 to 24 teams, Georgia qualified to the competition for the first time.

EuroBasket 2011

The national team played five matches in Group D. They finished their preliminary group with an 2-3 record, with wins against Belgium and Ukraine, to advance. In their second round group phase, Georgia lost all five of their matches to finish their maiden voyage to the EuroBasket in 11th place.

EuroBasket 2013

After finishing second in qualifying group, Georgia qualified for its second EuroBasket tournament. After a comfortable 84–67 victory in the opening match over Poland, Georgia lost their four remaining matches and finished the tournament with an 1-4 record. To that point, the Eurobasket 2013 was the only tournament in which Georgia could not win more than one match.

EuroBasket 2015

Georgia qualified to the EuroBasket for the third successive time in 2015. After three consecutive losses to start the tournament, the national team finally earned their first win in group play against Macedonia 90–75. They followed it up with another victory to end the opening phase of the event against Croatia, 71–58 to move on to the knockout stages for the first time. There they suffered a narrow hard fought defeat to the tournament favourites, and eventual silver medalist Lithuania 81–85.

EuroBasket 2017

During the EuroBasket 2017 qualification Georgia topped its group after an 90–84 victory over Montenegro, and qualified to EuroBasket for the fourth successive time. Once the competition began, the national team got off to a quick start, avenging their EuroBasket 2015 knockout stage defeat to Lithuania 79-77. The rest of the group stage didn't go as well for the Georgian side though. As the team could only manage to pullout one more victory against Israel, before falling to Italy to finish the tournament with an 2-3 record and being eliminated.

EuroBasket 2022

Georgia was the co-host the EuroBasket 2022, and they automatically qualified for the 2022 finals tournament. This was the fifth successive time that Georgia qualified for the event overall. Tbilisi was one of the host cities, and was used for Group A matches at the brand new Tbilisi Basketball Arena.

The Foundation
The core of the national team that has consistently qualified to Europe's biggest basketball competition consisted of captain Zaza Pachulia, Viktor Sanikidze, Manuchar Markoishvili, Tornike Shengelia, Giorgi Tsintsadze and Giorgi Shermadini. These pioneers in the Georgian basketball community have set the standard for future generations of the national team to build upon, and maintain.

Competitive record

FIBA World Cup

Olympic Games

EuroBasket

Recent results and forthcoming fixtures

2021

2022

2023

Team

Current roster
Roster for the 2023 FIBA World Cup Qualifiers matches on 23 and 26 February 2023 against Netherlands and Iceland.

Depth chart

Head coach history

Past rosters
2011 EuroBasket: finished 11th among 24 teams

4 Giorgi Gamqrelidze, 5 Vladimir Boisa, 6 Anatoli Boisa, 7 Zaza Pachulia, 8 Giorgi Tsintsadze, 9 Giorgi Shermadini, 10 Lasha Parghalava, 11 Manuchar Markoishvili, 12 MarQuez Haynes, 13 Viktor Sanikidze, 14 Tornike Shengelia, 15 Nikoloz Tskitishvili (Coach:  Igor Kokoškov)

2013 EuroBasket: finished 17th among 24 teams

4 Nika Metreveli, 5 Otar Pkhakadze, 6 Duda Sanadze, 7 Beka Burjanadze, 8 Giorgi Tsintsadze, 9 Giorgi Shermadini, 10 Ricky Hickman, 11 Manuchar Markoishvili, 12 Levan Patsatsia, 13 Viktor Sanikidze, 14 Besik Lezhava, 15 Nikoloz Tskitishvili (Coach:  Igor Kokoškov)

2015 EuroBasket: finished 15th among 24 teams

0 Jacob Pullen, 4 Nika Metreveli, 7 Zaza Pachulia (C), 8 Giorgi Tsintsadze, 9 Giorgi Shermadini, 10 Duda Sanadze, 11 Manuchar Markoishvili, 12 Levan Patsatsia, 13 Viktor Sanikidze, 15 Beka Burjanadze, 23 Tornike Shengelia, 25 Besik Lezhava (Coach:  Igor Kokoškov)

2017 EuroBasket: finished 17th among 24 teams

3 Michael Dixon, 4 Giorgi Gamqrelidze, 6 Anatoli Boisa, 7 Zaza Pachulia (C), 8 Giorgi Tsintsadze, 9 Giorgi Shermadini, 10 Duda Sanadze, 11 Manuchar Markoishvili, 17 Mikheil Berishvili, 23 Tornike Shengelia, 35 Goga Bitadze, 99 Ilia Londaridze (Coach:  Ilias Zouros)

2022 EuroBasket: finished 21st among 24 teams

4 Rati Andronikashvili, 5 Sandro Mamukelashvili, 6 Kakhaber Jintcharadze, 7 Beka Burjanadze, 8 Giorgi Tsintsadze, 9 Giorgi Shermadini (C), 10 Duda Sanadze, 17 Mikheil Berishvili, 18 Merab Bokolishvili, 25 Thad McFadden, 33 Beka Bekauri, 35 Goga Bitadze  (Coach:  Ilias Zouros)

Head-to-head record

Record by opponents

Record against teams at the EuroBasket

Notable results

Kit

Manufacturer
2015–present: Spalding

Sponsor
2015: Natakhtari
2019: Georgian Railway

See also

Sport in Georgia
Georgia women's national basketball team
Georgia men's national under-20 basketball team
Georgia men's national under-18 basketball team
Georgia men's national under-16 basketball team

Notes

References

External links

 
Georgia FIBA profile
Georgia National Team – Men at Eurobasket.com
Georgia Basketball Records at FIBA Archive

Basketball teams in Georgia (country)
Men's national basketball teams
National sports teams of Georgia (country)
1992 establishments in Georgia (country)